[[File:Nothronychus chevrons.png|thumb|Haemal arches of Nothronychus]]
A haemal arch also known as a chevron, is a bony arch on the ventral side of a tail vertebra of a vertebrate. The canal formed by the space between the arch and the vertebral body is the haemal canal. A spinous ventral process emerging from the haemal arch is referred to as the haemal spine.

Blood vessels to and from the tail run through the arch. In reptiles, the caudofemoralis longus muscle, one of the main muscles involved in locomotion, attaches to the lateral sides of the haemal arches.

In 1956, Alfred Sherwood Romer hypothesized that the position of the first haemal arch was sexually dimorphic in crocodilians and dinosaurs. However, subsequent research established that the size and position of the first haemal arch was not sexually dimorphic in crocodilians and found no evidence of significant variation in tyrannosaurid dinosaurs, indicating that haemal arches could not be used to distinguish between sexes after all.

Haemal arches play an important role in the taxonomy of sauropod dinosaurs, as sauropods exhibit a wide range of morphologies of the haemal arches. In 1878, Othniel Marsh named the sauropod Diplodocus after the distinctive shape of its haemal arches, which were forked to have both an anterior and posterior process. Though once thought to be a specialized characteristic of Diplodocus'' and its close relatives, forked chevrons are now known to have been widespread among sauropod dinosaurs, although titanosauriform sauropods returned to the unforked condition.

References

Vertebrate anatomy